Arsi Piispanen (born, 25 July 1985) is a Finnish professional ice hockey forward who currently plays for IK Oskarshamn in the Swedish Hockey League (SHL). He was selected by the Columbus Blue Jackets in the fifth round, 138th overall, of the 2003 NHL Entry Draft.

He previously played with HPK of the Finnish Liiga before joining Oskarshamn.

Career statistics

Regular season and playoffs

International

References

External links

1985 births
Living people
Columbus Blue Jackets draft picks
Finnish ice hockey forwards
HPK players
Jokerit players
JYP Jyväskylä players
Lahti Pelicans players
IK Oskarshamn players
Tappara players
Sportspeople from Jyväskylä
21st-century Finnish people
Finnish expatriate ice hockey players in Sweden